Todd Philip Haskell (born 1962) is an American diplomat and career Foreign Service Officer who previously served as the United States Ambassador to the Republic of the Congo. He is currently the Chargé d’Affaires ad interim at the U.S. Embassy in Pretoria, South Africa. Prior to assuming his current position, he served as Ambassador to the Republic of the Congo and before that, Deputy Assistant Secretary in the Bureau of African Affairs at the United States Department of State from 2015 to 2017. In February 2017, President Donald Trump nominated Haskell for the position of United States Ambassador to the Republic of the Congo. Haskell had originally been nominated for the position by outgoing President Barack Obama in January 2017. When Trump took office, he withdrew Haskell's nomination before reinstating his nomination. Haskell was confirmed for the position by the United States Senate on May 18, 2017.

Haskell has held diplomatic posts in Santo Domingo, Dominican Republic (2010–2013), Johannesburg, South Africa (2006–2010), Burkina Faso (2003–2006), Mexico City (2001–2003), Tel Aviv, Israel (1996–2000), Poznań, Poland (1992–1993), the Sinai Peninsula (1990–1991), Manila, Philippines (1988–1990), and Karachi, Pakistan (1986–1988).

Personal life
Haskell speaks French, Spanish, and Hebrew.

References

External links
 Biography at U.S. Embassy in the Republic of the Congo

1962 births
Living people
21st-century American diplomats
Ambassadors of the United States to the Democratic Republic of the Congo
Georgetown University alumni
United States Foreign Service personnel